Magareng Local Municipality is an administrative area in the Frances Baard District of the Northern Cape in South Africa.

Magareng is a Setswana name meaning "in the middle". The name reflects the geographic location of the municipality in relation to other areas.

Main places
The 2011 census divided the municipality into the following main places:

Politics 

The municipal council consists of eleven members elected by mixed-member proportional representation. Six councillors are elected by first-past-the-post voting in six wards, while the remaining five are chosen from party lists so that the total number of party representatives is proportional to the number of votes received. In the election of 1 November 2021 the African National Congress (ANC) won a majority of six seats on the council.
The following table shows the results of the election.

References

Local municipalities of the Frances Baard District Municipality